The Hawker Hawfinch was a British single-engined biplane fighter of the 1920s. It was unsuccessful, with the Bristol Bulldog being selected instead.

Development
The Hawker Hawfinch fighter aircraft was designed in 1925 as a replacement for both the Armstrong-Whitworth Siskin and the Gloster Gamecock fighters. It participated in the  competition to meet Specification F9/26, together with other aircraft manufacturers, that included nine different designs, of which five were built. The Hawfinch first flew in March 1927. The Bristol Bulldog and the Hawfinch were considered to be the best of the aircraft evaluated, and were selected for more detailed evaluation. The contract was finally awarded to the Bristol Bulldog, because of its slightly higher maximum speed as well as being easier to maintain. After the completion of the competition, the prototype Hawfinch was used for experimental purposes, being tested with single-bay wings and with a twin-float undercarriage.

Only one prototype was built.

Description
The Hawfinch was a two-bay biplane with staggered wings. The structure was the patented Hawker metal tube & "fishplate" system, with fabric covering. It was the first all-metal fighter to be built by Hawker. The powerplant was initially a Bristol Jupiter VI engine, but this was changed to a Jupiter VII (450 hp/336 kW) before the performance trials. The armament consisted of two Vickers machine guns synchronised to fire through the propeller.

Specifications (Hawfinch (Jupiter VII))

See also

References

  

1920s British fighter aircraft
Hawfinch
Single-engined tractor aircraft
Biplanes
Aircraft first flown in 1927